St Mary and St George Church (SMG), High Wycombe is a free Byzantine style Grade II listed church, and is situated in the Diocese of Oxford. The church is notable because of its green copper dome which is considered a landmark in High Wycombe.

History 
The church was built in 1935-1938 by Gerald Wellesley, 7th Duke of Wellington and Trenwith Wills.  It is Grade II* Listed.  St Mary & St George has been a centre of Anglo-Catholic worship for most of its history.

The newer adjacent church hall operates as a private day-nursery for Little Cherubs Nursery between Monday and Friday.

Today

In 2015 the PCC of St Mary & St George entered into an agreement with the PCC of St Andrew's Church, Hatters Lane, which would see a 'church planting team' sent across to establish a new worshipping community and help to revitalise the ministry and mission of the church.

In 2018, Revd. Jonny Dade was licensed by the Bishop of Buckingham as the Pioneer Minister to St Mary & St George (SMG) with a remit to lead 30 adults and children to plant a new congregation in SMG.  The project was supported by the Diocese of Oxford, the Wycombe Deanery and New Wine.  In March 2019 the new congregation was launched.

'SMG Church' as it is colloquially known is a community of all ages and with a focus on connecting with its parish area of Sands & Castlefield, which is am ethnically and culturally diverse community and one of the most economically deprived in the county.

The worshipping style of the church is varied, with a traditional Eucharistic service alongside a newer contemporary family gathering with live worship, Bible teaching and ministry.  The church partners with Youth for Christ (YFC), One YMCA and New Wine and enjoys an ongoing relationship with St Andrew's, Hatters Lane.  In 2019 SMG launched a number of small 'Missional Communities' which each have different areas of focus.

References

External links 
 Official website

Churches in Buckinghamshire
Byzantine sacred architecture
High Wycombe
Diocese of Oxford
Church of England church buildings in Buckinghamshire
20th-century Church of England church buildings
Grade II* listed churches in Buckinghamshire